Survivor – A sziget (season 3) is the third season of the Hungarian version of Survivor which was broadcast on RTL Klub from 28 August 2017. It is hosted by Bence Istenes. The show was brought back to Hungarian television after 13 years. The format is similar to the U.S. version of Survivor and to the Australian Survivor. It is broadcast on weekdays at 7.pm.

There are 17 contestants divided into two tribes called Buwaya and Ibon. The winner of the show, the Sole Survivor will get 20 Million Ft. Unlike the previous two seasons the winner won't be decided by a public vote, rather with the usual Survivor jury format. The winner of the season was Iliász.

Results

Episode 1 First Reward challenge winners: Buwaya

Episode 2 First Immunity challenge winners: Buwaya

Episode 3 First Tribal Council Ibon

Episode 4 Reward Challenge winners: Ibon

Episode 5 Immunity Challenge winners: Buwaya

Episode 6 Tribal Council: Ibon

Episode 7 Reward Challenge winners: Buwaya

Episode 8 Immunity Challenge winners: Buwaya

Episode 9 Tribal Council: Ibon

Episode 10 Reward Challenge winners: Ibon
+ Tribe Switch

Episode 11 Immunity Challenge winners: Buwaya

Episode 12 Tribal Council: Ibon

Episode 13 Reward Challenge winners: Ibon

Episode 14 Immunity Challenge winners: Ibon

Episode 15 Tribal Council: Buwaya

Episode 16 Merge + Challenge to stay in the game

Episode 17 Individual Immunity Challenge winner: Adrienn + Tribal Council

Episode 18 Reward Challenge winner: Szandra

Episode 19 Individual Immunity Challenge winner: Iliász

Episode 20 Tribal Council

Episode 21 Reward Challenge winners: Zoli, Benedek, Klaudia

Episode 22 Island of the Dead Challenge + Individual Immunity Challenge winner: Iliász

Episode 23 Tribal Council

Episode 24 Reward Challenge winner: Benedek

Episode 25 Island of the Dead Challenge 2

Episode 26 Immunity Challenge winner: Feri + Tribal council

Episode 27 Reward Challenge winner: Szandi

Episode 28 Immunity Challenge winner: Feri + Island of the Dead Challenge 3

Episode 29 Tribal Council

Episode 30 Immunity Challenge winner: Feri

Episode 31 Tribal Council

Episode 32 Final Island of the Dead Challenge winner: Iliász

Episode 33 First Semi-Final winner: Iliász

Episode 34 Second Semi-Final winner: Feri

Episode 35 Final Tribal Council

Contestants

Hungary
2017 Hungarian television seasons